Waputikia is a possible red alga of the middle Cambrian Burgess shale.  It comprises a main stem about 1 cm across, with the longest recovered fossil 6 cm in length.  Branches of a similar diameter emerge from the side of the main branch, then rapidly bifurcate to much finer widths.  The fossils are smooth and shiny; no internal structure can be recognised. 10 specimens of Waputikia are known from the Greater Phyllopod bed, where they comprise < 0.1% of the community.

References

External links
 

Burgess Shale fossils
Red algae genera
Fossil algae
Cambrian genus extinctions